Columbia High School, located in Burbank, Washington, is a public high school serving 230 students in grades nine through 12. The current principal is Kyle Miller.

The student body is 77% White, 20% Hispanic, and 1% each American Indian, Asian, and black.

References

External links 
 
 

Public high schools in Washington (state)
High schools in Walla Walla County, Washington